DJ Jackie Christie is an American DJ, songwriter, and music producer based in New York City.  She is well known for her work at MTV's The Grind and The Limelight in New York City.  She began releasing singles in 1997, originally under the alias, Shine, and her first album, Made 4 U, in 2004.  The first single, "Beautiful Day," charted at #14 on the Billboard Club Chart.  She also released a #1 remix of Madonna's "Nothing Falls" (Warner Bros.) as well as remixes of Yoko Ono's "Open Your Box" on Mind Train Records, and Kung Pow's "R U A DJ?" on Xtreme Records.  She plans to sing on future albums.

Christie was mentioned in Bret Easton Ellis's Glamorama, and her music has appeared in Beauty Shop, and on TV's Street Time and Jenna Jameson’s One Hundred Hottest Hotties on VH1.

Discography
 DJ Jackie Christie - Made 4 U  (Motéma Dance, 2004)
 DJ Jackie Christie Feat. Discomind - Beautiful Day (Motéma Dance single, 2004)
 DJ Jackie Christie - Hot and Tasty Beats (Nervous Records, 2003)
 DJ Jackie Christie - A-U-T-Omatic  White Label (2001)
 DJ Jackie Christie - Hard Tasty Beats (Nervous, 1999)
 Shine - Bitch  Groovilicious/Strictly Rhythm (1998)
 Shine - Stimulating And Exciting (ft Connie Lingus & Phil Aseo)  Groovilicious (1999)
 Dolce - Fire  Tommy Boy Records

References

External links
Official site
DJ Jackie Christie at Motéma Music
DJ Jackie Christie at AllMusic
DJ Jackie Christie interview on MyGayWeb.com

Living people
Women DJs
Year of birth missing (living people)
American DJs
Motéma Music artists